Ernst Raatma (also Ernst Rosenberg; 17 February 1891 Helme Parish, Viljandi County – 21 September 1959 Rakvere) was an Estonian politician. He was a member of III Riigikogu. He was a member of the Riigikogu since 24 October 1928. He replaced Kristjan Kaarna.

References

1891 births
1959 deaths
Members of the Riigikogu, 1926–1929